Saiyami Kher is an Indian actress who primarily works in Hindi and Telugu films. She made her acting debut with the Telugu film Rey (2015) and her Hindi film debut with Mirzya (2016), for which she received Stardust Award for Superstar of Tomorrow – Female.

Kher made her Marathi film debut with Mauli (2018) and went onto act in Choked (2020) and Wild Dog (2021). She made her web debut with Special OPS (2020).

Early life and family
Kher was born in Nashik, Maharashtra to Adwait Kher and Uttara Mhatre Kher, a former Miss India. She is the granddaughter of actress Usha Kiran and the niece of actress Tanvi Azmi. Kher completed her graduation from St. Xavier's College, Mumbai.

Her father Advait Kher was a renowned supermodel and her older sister Sanskruti Kher, is also a celebrated Marathi actress.

Career 
In 2015, Kher made her debut with Telugu film Rey and appeared in Rakesh Omprakash Mehra's Punjabi folklore Mirza Sahiban based Hindi film Mirzya opposite Harshvardhan Kapoor in following the year.

In 2020, She appeared in Mayank Sharma's web series Breathe alongside Abhishek Bachchan.

In 2021, she did a role in Telugu movie Wild Dog (film) with Nagarjuna Akkineni as an NIA Agent. The theatrical release of film was on 2 April 2021. Later, it was on Netflix India.

Filmography

Films

Web series

Awards and nominations

References

External links
 
 

Living people
21st-century Indian actresses
Actresses in Telugu cinema
Indian film actresses
Actresses in Hindi cinema
1992 births